Mount Grace is a mountain in north central Massachusetts.
Mount Grace (Chugach Mountains), a summit in Alaska

Mount Grace may also refer to:
 Mount Grace Land Conservation Trust, Massachusetts
 Mount Grace Priory, Yorkshire, England, a former Carthusian monastery
 Mount Grace School, Potters Bar, Hertfordshire, England
 Mount Grace State Forest, Massachusetts

See also